Thompson Municipal Airport  is an airport in Mystery Lake located  north of Thompson, Manitoba, Canada. It is the third-busiest airport in Manitoba after Winnipeg James Armstrong Richardson International Airport and Winnipeg/St. Andrews Airport.

History
Thompson Airport was developed originally by the International Nickel Company in 1961 to support their mining operations and had one runway  in length.

The airport was transferred to Transport Canada in 1963. It was then operated by the Local Government District of Mystery Lake until March 2000, when ownership was taken over by the Thompson Regional Airport Authority, which is the current operator.

The airport is served by Calm Air and Perimeter Aviation with flights to Winnipeg. There are also bases for Custom Helicopters, Wings Over Kississing, Fast Air Royal Canadian Mounted Police Air Services Branch and Manitoba Government Air Services. During the fire fighting season, Thompson is home to the Government Air water bombers.

Airlines and destinations

Passsenger

Cargo

References

External links 
Thompson Municipal Airport

Certified airports in Manitoba
Thompson, Manitoba